Sun Zhonghuan, is a Chinese politician. He is the former mayor of Hangzhou, Zhejiang. He is the current Chairman of the Hangzhou Political Consultative Conference, a largely ceremonial role.

Career

Sun was born in July 1948 in Yuyao, Ningbo City, Zhejiang Province. Sun studied in Hangzhou University (current Zhejiang University) and the Party School of the Central Committee of the Communist Party of China.

Sun's career includes:
 February 1969 – February 1974, soldier of People's Liberation Army 5170 Branch;
 December 1983 – October 1985, Deputy Secretary and Mayor of Lanxi, Jinhua City, Zhejiang Province;
 November 1989 – March 1993, Secretary of Yongkang, Jinhua City;
 March 1993 – September 1994, Deputy Director of the Zhejiang Provincial Trade and Industry Bureau;
 September 1994 – April 1995, Deputy Secretary and Director of the Zhejiang Provincial Trade and Industry Bureau;
 April 1995 – August 1996, General Secretary and Director of the Zhejiang Provincial Trade and Industry Bureau;
 August 1996 – May 2000, Party Secretary of Taizhou City;
 May 2000 – January 2002, Party Secretary of Taizhou City and the Chief Director of the Taizhou NPC;
 January 2002 – February 2003, General Secretary and Chief Director of the Zhejiang Economic and Trade Commission
 April 2004 – January 2005, Deputy Secretary, Vice-mayor and Acting Mayor of Hangzhou;
 February 2005 – April 2007, Deputy Secretary and Mayor of Hangzhou;
 April 2007–present, Chairman of the Hangzhou CPPC.

References

External links
 Mayor Sun Zhonghuan met with the delegation of Bank of East Asia Ltd headed by Board Chairman

Zhejiang University alumni
Hangzhou University alumni
Politicians from Ningbo
1948 births
Living people
Regional leaders in the People's Republic of China
People's Republic of China politicians from Zhejiang
Chinese Communist Party politicians from Zhejiang
Political office-holders in Zhejiang
Mayors of places in China
People from Yuyao